Eudonia luminatrix is a moth in the family Crambidae. It was described by Edward Meyrick in 1909. This species is endemic to New Zealand.

The wingspan is 19–22 mm. The forewings are deep ochreous-brown, streaked with blackish on the veins. The first and second lines are white, edged posteriorly with black suffusion. The hindwings are whitish-fuscous tinged with brassy-yellowish. The discal spot, postmedian line and terminal fascia are fuscous. Adults have been recorded on wing in October and November.

References

Moths described in 1909
Eudonia
Moths of New Zealand
Endemic fauna of New Zealand
Taxa named by Edward Meyrick
Endemic moths of New Zealand